The men's heptathlon event  at the 1996 European Athletics Indoor Championships was held in Stockholm Globe Arena on 9–10 March.

Results

References

Detailed results

Combined events at the European Athletics Indoor Championships
Heptathlon